The 80th parallel south is a circle of latitude that is 80 degrees south of the Earth's equatorial plane, and 10 degrees (690 miles/1100 kilometers) north of the United States Amundsen Scott South Pole Station. Regions south of this latitude are excluded from UTM zones.

This line of latitude passes only through Antarctica and Antarctic ice shelves.

Around the world
Starting at the Prime Meridian and heading eastwards, the parallel 80° south passes through:

{| class="wikitable plainrowheaders"
! scope="col" width="125" | Co-ordinates
! scope="col" | Continent
! scope="col" | Sub-continent
! scope="col" | Local area
! scope="col" | Claimed by
|-
| 
! scope="row" rowspan="12" | Antarctica
| rowspan="5" | West Antarctica 
| Part of Queen Maud Land
|  
|-
| 
| Enderby Land, Kemp Land, Mac. Robertson Land, Princess Elizabeth Land, Kaiser Wilhelm II Land, Queen Mary Land, Wilkes Land, aka Western Australian Antarctic Territory
|   
|-
| 
| Adélie Land
|   
|-
| 
| George V Land, Oates Land, Victoria Land, aka Eastern Australian Antarctic Territory
|   
|-
| 
| Ross Dependency
|   
|-
| 
| rowspan="5" | East Antarctica 
| Marie Byrd LandEllsworth Land
| Unclaimed territory
|-
| 
| Ellsworth Land, in parts Antártica Chilena
|   
|-
| 
| Ellsworth Land
|-
| 
| Antarctic Peninsula
|-
| 
| Filchner-Ronne Ice Shelf
|-
| 
| rowspan="2" | West Antarctica 
| Coats Land, part of British Antarctic Territory
|   
|-
| 
| Part of Queen Maud Land
|   
|}

See also
79th parallel south
List of Antarctic and sub-Antarctic islands
South Pole

s80
Geography of Antarctica